Beggars and Choosers is an American comedy-drama series broadcast by Showtime. Developed by Peter Lefcourt and Brandon Tartikoff, the series was a comedic, behind-the-scenes look at network television. Its 42 episodes aired between June 19, 1999, and February 6, 2001.

Synopsis
The tongue-in-cheek series centered on Rob Malone, President of LGT, and his efforts to boost the network's sagging ratings with Lori Volpone, the scheming Vice-President of Development, and Malcolm Laffley, a gay man who came out of the closet to clear himself of sexual harassment charges levied against him by a woman. Each episode provided amusing insight into how a network runs, from how its executives deal with temperamental stars to how they make big budget deals while trying to keep the network financially stable.

Characters
 Rob Malone (Brian Kerwin)
 Lori Volpone (Charlotte Ross): The ambitious Vice President of Development for LGT
 Malcolm Laffley (Tuc Watkins)
 Kelly Kramer (Christina Hendricks)
 Cecile Malone (Isabella Hofmann): Rob's wife 
 Brad Advail (William McNamara): An agent who is a thorn in Rob's side
 Parker Meridian (Paul Provenza): The egomaniacal star of the hit LGT show Parker's Pals who is romantically involved with Rob's daughter Audrey
 Audrey Malone (Keegan Connor Tracy): Rob and Cecile's slightly flaky 21-year-old daughter
 Emory "E.L." Luddin (Bill Morey): The frequently comatose founder and former CEO of LGT
 Lydia "L.L." Luddin (Carol Kane): E.L.'s wife, whose plans for an eponymous variety show are thwarted when Dan Falco buys the network
 Casey Lenox (Sherri Saum):  A young ambitious new hire at LGT that Lori Volpone fears could threaten her career path 
 Dan Falco (Beau Bridges): A Buddhist who acquires ownership of LGT after obtaining 53% of the company's stock during a power struggle between the Luddins
 Wayne (Alex Zahara)

Episodes

Season 1: 1999–2000

Season 2: 2000–01

Production notes
The series was created by former NBC television executive Brandon Tartikoff who based the series on his own experiences. Tartikoff, whose wife Lily served as a producer on the series, died of Hodgkin's Disease two years before the series debuted.

Filmed in Vancouver, Beggars and Choosers was produced for Showtime by Granada Entertainment
USA and distributor by Buena Vista Television.

Reception and cancellation
Beggars and Choosers garnered very positive reviews from critics and, according to Showtime executive vice president of original programming Gary Levine, had a loyal audience, but ratings for the series remained low. Showtime canceled the series after two seasons in December 2000.

Awards and nominations

References

External links
  
 

1990s American comedy-drama television series
1990s Canadian comedy-drama television series
2000s American comedy-drama television series
2000s Canadian comedy-drama television series
1999 American television series debuts
1999 Canadian television series debuts
2001 American television series endings
2001 Canadian television series endings
English-language television shows
Showtime (TV network) original programming
Television series about television
Television series by CBS Studios
Television series by Disney–ABC Domestic Television
1990s American LGBT-related drama television series
2000s American LGBT-related drama television series
2000s American LGBT-related comedy television series
Television shows filmed in Vancouver